Vijayabahu III was the first King of Dambadeniya, who ruled from 1220- 1224. He was also called "Kali-Kala Sarvagna Pandith". He was a member of the Sinhala Royal Family who began the Siri Sanga Bo dynasty, he was succeeded by his son Parakkamabahu II. Before he became the king of Dambadeniya, he was a ruler of a small province – a Vanni chieftain. Vijayabahu III brought the relic of the tooth of the Buddha to Dambadeniya – after it was hidden in Kotmale with the invasion of Kalinga Magha – and was placed in the Beligala Temple of Tooth. At that time, people of Dambadeniya considered the possession of the aforementioned relic, a clear indication that Vijayabahu III was the rightful King of Dambadeniya.

In Popular culture
In the 2013 film Siri Parakum directed by Somaratne Dissanayake, Palitha Silva played the role of Vijayabahu III.

See also
 List of Sri Lankan monarchs
 History of Sri Lanka

References

External links
 Kings & Rulers of Sri Lanka
 Codrington's Short History of Ceylon

Monarchs of Dambadeniya
House of Siri Sanga Bo
V
V
 Sinhalese Buddhist monarchs